Kismet is a 1930 American pre-Code costume drama film photographed entirely in an early widescreen process using 65mm film that Warner Bros. called Vitascope. The film, now considered lost, was based on Edward Knoblock's play Kismet, and was previously filmed as a silent film in 1920 which also starred Otis Skinner.

Plot
Hajj, a rascally beggar on the periphery of the court of Baghdad, schemes to marry his daughter to royalty and to win the heart of the queen of the castle himself.

Production
Warner Bros. spared no expense in making this picture. They spent $600,000 in producing it, and the extravagance of the film was noted by every reviewer. The film played in ten cities across the United States in the wide-screen Vitascope (65mm) version, while the rest of the country (which did not yet have theaters capable of playing widescreen films) were provided with standard 35mm prints. Otis Skinner was 73 years old while lead actress Loretta Young was 17 years old.

Box office
According to Warner Bros. records, the film earned $315,000 domestic and $147,000 foreign.

Preservation status
The enormous amount of pre-Code content (especially in the sequences in the harem) has probably contributed to the film's "lost" status.

Two remakes, both in color, were made of the film, one in 1944 and the other in 1955. The 1955 version was an adaptation of the hit Broadway musical based on the play. Some sources claim that the original 1930 film featured Technicolor sequences. The film is considered lost, while the complete soundtrack of the film survives on Vitaphone disks. An outtake of the production does exist and can be seen.

Foreign-language versions
One foreign-language version of the 1930 version of Kismet was made. The German version, also titled Kismet, was directed by William Dieterle, and was released in 1931.

See also
List of lost films
List of incomplete or partially lost films
Widescreen

References

External links
 
 
 

1930 films
1930s musical drama films
1930s fantasy films
American musical drama films
American multilingual films
American films based on plays
Films directed by John Francis Dillon
Lost American films
First National Pictures films
Warner Bros. films
Films produced by Robert North
1930 multilingual films
1930 lost films
Lost drama films
1930 drama films
Films scored by Edward Ward (composer)
1930s English-language films
1930s American films